Jevdokija Balšić (died after 1428), was a Zetan aristocrat and regent. She wife of Esau de' Buondelmonti, despot of Ioannina. She was regent of Ioannina during the minority of her son in 1411.

Life 

Jevdokija Balšić was the daughter of Đurađ I Balšić, lord of Zeta, and Theodora Dejanović, daughter Dejan, despot of Kumanovo. Around 1402, Esau de' Buondelmonti, despot of Ioannina, got divorce of his second wife Irene Spata and he married with Jevdokija. 

In 1411, they had a son, Giorgio. In that year, Esau died and was succeeded by Giorgio. Jevdokija tried to take the control of Ioannina in the name of her son. However, she was unpopular among the nobility of Ioannina. When she wanted to get married with a Serbian noble, she was deposed by the nobility of Ioannina; they gave the city to Carlo I Tocco, Count Palatine of Cephalonia and Zakynthos and Esau’s nephew. 

After she was expelled, Jevdokija went to the court of John Zenevisi, prince of Argyrokastro. Then, she traveled to Ragusa, where she lived with Giorgio until her dead after 1428.

References

Sources 

 
 
 
 

Balšić noble family
15th-century women rulers